L'En-Dehors (The Outside) is a French individualist anarchist newspaper, created by Zo d'Axa in 1891.

History
Numerous activists contributed to the paper, including Jean Grave, Bernard Lazare, Albert Libertad, Octave Mirbeau, Saint-Pol-Roux, Tristan Bernard, Georges Darien, Lucien Descaves, Sébastien Faure, Félix Fénéon, Émile Henry, Camille Mauclair, Émile Verhaeren, and Adolphe Tabarant. 

When Ravachol was arrested, Zo d'Axa proposed his help to the family and was also arrested. The paper was targeted by the Trial of the Thirty, a show trial of anarchists in France in 1894.

In 1922, the second En-Dehors was published by Émile Armand, whose real name was Ernest Juin. Armand promoted individual freedom, feminism (Emma Goldman), free love and anarchism. Because of World War II, the publication of the En-Dehors was stopped in October 1939.

In 2002, as an anarchist, Libertad organized a new version of the En-Dehors, collaborating with Green Anarchy and including several contributors, such as Lawrence Jarach, Patrick Mignard, Thierry Lodé, Ron Sakolsky, and Thomas Slut. Numerous articles about capitalism, human rights, free love and social fights were published. The En-Dehors continues now as a website, EnDehors.net.

See also 
List of anarchist periodicals
Individualist anarchism in Europe

References

External links
 Our Rule of Ideological Conduct: Manifesto of the journal L'En-Dehors by Émile Armand
 Official website
 Two old versions of the En-Dehors  Zo d'Axa and E. Armand EnDehors
 Green Anarchy 
 En-dehors, L’ (1922/1939)-a few articles in french of Armand´s L’en-dehors

Anarchist newspapers
Individualist anarchism
Anarchist periodicals published in France
Newspapers published in France
Publications established in 1891